King of the World is an American television film which aired on January 10, 2000 on ABC. It chronicles the early stages of the career of heavyweight boxer Muhammad Ali (then known as Cassius Clay), who is portrayed by Terrence Howard. It is based upon a biography of the same name by David Remnick.

Cast and crew
Terrence Howard - Cassius Clay
Steve Harris - Sonny Liston
Chi McBride - Drew Bundini Brown
Gary Dourdan - Malcolm X
John Ventimiglia - Angelo Dundee
Jamie "Showtime" Stafford - Young Cassius Clay

Plot summary
Having won the gold medal for boxing in the light heavyweight division at the 1960 Summer Olympics in Rome, Kentucky native Cassius Clay (Terrence Howard) challenges professional heavyweight boxing champion Sonny Liston (Steve Harris) for the title. The media is both intrigued and repulsed by his brash manner and what appears to be self-worship. Despite being a heavy underdog, the 22-year-old Clay shocks the sports world by defeating Liston by technical knockout in their February 1964 bout, becoming heavyweight champion and (metaphorically) "king of the world".

DVD
Although it is an American film, King of the World was released on DVD in Region 2 format, which is used predominantly in Europe. It has yet to be released in Region 1 format, which is compatible with DVD players used in the United States and Canada.

References

External links 
 

Films about Muhammad Ali
2000 television films
2000 films
American biographical drama films
African-American drama films
American boxing films
Films set in the 1960s
American films based on actual events
Films shot in Houston
Sports films based on actual events
2000 biographical drama films
2000s sports drama films
American drama television films
2000s English-language films
2000s American films